Ante Vrban (15 January 1908 – 31 August 1948) was a Croatian major of the Ustaše Militia and later the Croatian Armed Forces of the Independent State of Croatia during World War II. He served as deputy commander of the Stara Gradiška concentration camp and was responsible for various atrocities committed there during the war. After the collapse of the Independent State of Croatia, he fled and sought refuge in Austria. In the summer of 1945, he returned to Yugoslavia with the intention of starting an anti-communist uprising. He was arrested by Yugoslav authorities and charged with war crimes. Vrban was found guilty on all counts and hanged in August 1948.

Biography
Vrban was born on 15 January 1908 in Pejakuša, near Gospić. Before World War II, he worked as a trading assistant.

After the formation of the Independent State of Croatia, he joined the Ustasha Militia. In the summer of 1941, he took part in the killings of Serbs in Lika, as well as in the killings of Jews in the Jadovno concentration camp.

He arrived at the Stara Gradiška camp on 13 November 1941, and brought with him a group of captured Freemasons. For some time he was the deputy commander of the camp which was commanded by Mile Orešković. At the post-war trial, he admitted to poisoning 63 sick children with Zyklon B.

He took part in the Battle of Lijevče Field. After the collapse of the Independent State of Croatia, he withdrew to Austria, but in 1946 he returned briefly to Croatia to establish contact with the Crusaders. The following year, the UDBA captured him on Mount Papuk, together with Ljubo Miloš. At the trial before the Supreme Court of the People's Republic of Croatia with Ustashas caught in Operation Gvardijan, Vrban was sentenced to death by hanging.

In popular culture
In the 1983 four-part TV Zagreb mini-series Zamke (Traps), Vrban is portrayed by Zdenko Jelčić. In the 2021 historical drama Dara of Jasenovac directed by Predrag Antonijević, Vrban is portrayed by Igor Đorđević.

References

Sources

 
 
 

1908 births
1948 deaths
Anti-Masonry
Anti-Serbian sentiment
Croatian people convicted of war crimes
Croatian people convicted of crimes against humanity
Croatian fascists
Croatian anti-communists
Croatian irredentism
Croatian collaborators with Nazi Germany
Croatian nationalists
Croatian people of World War II
Executed Croatian people
Fugitives
Genocide of Serbs in the Independent State of Croatia perpetrators
Holocaust perpetrators in Yugoslavia
People executed by Yugoslavia by hanging
People from Gospić
Romani genocide perpetrators
Ustaše concentration camp personnel
Ustaša Militia personnel
Yugoslav anti-communists
Executed Nazi concentration camp commandants
Executed mass murderers